Onnen is a village in the municipality of Groningen in the Netherlands. There are some picturesque farms and windmills in the village.

Onnen is an esdorp. The Onner ash lies a considerable distance from the actual village (an ash generally lies flat outside a village).

The Groningen – Assen railway lies near Onnen. NedTrain's classification yard is also situated close to Onnen.

History 
The village was first mentioned in 1323 as Hunne. The etymology is unclear. Onnen developed as an esdorp. During the Middle Ages, the peat in the area was excavated. 

Onnen was home to 264 people in 1840.

Gallery

References

External links 
 

Groningen (city)
Populated places in Groningen (province)